David Giraudo (born 3 February 1970) is a French former professional footballer who played as a defender in Ligue 2 for Red Star 93 and Olympique Alès. Towards the end of his career, Giraudo played in Portugal for Académica and Sporting Espinho.

See also
Football in France
List of football clubs in France

References

1970 births
Living people
Footballers from Occitania (administrative region)
Sportspeople from Gard
French footballers
Association football defenders
Olympique Alès players
Red Star F.C. players
Associação Académica de Coimbra – O.A.F. players
Ligue 2 players